David Edelman may refer to:

 David Louis Edelman (born 1971), American novelist and web programmer
 David Carl Edelman (born 1961), chief marketing officer at Aetna
 R. David Edelman, American policymaker and academic